Alois Biach (1 May 1849 – 1918) was an Austrian physician and medical writer.

Biach was born in Lettowitz, Moravia, in 1849. He was educated at the gymnasium at Brünn and at the University of Vienna. After graduating as Doctor of Medicine in 1873, he established himself in Vienna, where he was appointed a member of the board of health. In 1883 he became privat-docent of medicine at the university in that city. Biach also occupied the position of secretary to the society of physicians of Lower Austria.

Publication

References
 

1849 births
1918 deaths
Academic staff of the University of Vienna
Austrian Empire Jews
Austrian Empire physicians
Austro-Hungarian Jews
Austro-Hungarian physicians
Austro-Hungarian writers
Jewish Czech writers
Jewish physicians
Moravian Jews
People from Letovice
People from the Margraviate of Moravia
University of Vienna alumni